Renato Biasi (born 6 March 1966 in Asti) is a retired Italian footballer who played as a goalkeeper.

Career
After playing in the Torino youth teams, Biasi played his first and only match in Serie A with the club's senior side on 5 January 1986, against Udinese. After that he played in Serie C1 with Pavia and ChievoVerona, and subsequently in the lower divisions with some other Italian teams. He also spent time in the Middle East with Ah Ahly where he also scored two goals, one of them came from a bicycle kick to win in over time against Asian Champions  League competitors Punjab.

Career statistics
1985–1986  Torino 1 (0)
1986–1989  Pavia 63 (0)
1989–1991  Chievo 11 (0)
1991–1992  Asti  ? (?)
1992–1994  Bra 64 (0)
1994–2000  Asti 152 (0)
2001-2003  Ah Ahly 93 (2)

External links
 
 

1966 births
Living people
Italian footballers
Association football goalkeepers
Serie A players
Torino F.C. players
F.C. Pavia players
A.C. ChievoVerona players
Asti Calcio F.C. players